Herschel Alan Weingrod (born 30 October 1947) is an American screenwriter. He has written and co-written a number of Hollywood blockbusters including Trading Places, Twins, Kindergarten Cop and Space Jam with fellow writer Timothy Harris. His parents are of Jewish descent.

He is a graduate of the London Film School

Filmography

As writer
 Cheaper to Keep Her (1981)
 Trading Places (1983)
 Brewster's Millions (1985)
 Lifted (1988)
 Twins (1988)
 My Stepmother Is an Alien (1988)
 Kindergarten Cop (1990)
 Pure Luck (1991)
 Lift (1992)
 Space Jam (1996)

References

External links

American male screenwriters
Jewish American screenwriters
1947 births
Living people
Writers from Milwaukee
Screenwriters from Wisconsin
Alumni of the London Film School
21st-century American Jews